Lee Dong-won may refer to:

Lee Dong-won (figure skater), South Korean figure skater
Lee Dong-won (footballer), South Korean footballer